The Khyber Pass is a mountain pass in the Khyber Pakhtunkhwa province of Pakistan, on the border with the Nangarhar Province of Afghanistan. It connects the town of Landi Kotal to the Valley of Peshawar at Jamrud by traversing part of the White Mountains. Since it was part of the ancient Silk Road, it has been a vital trade route between Central Asia and the Indian subcontinent and a strategic military choke point for various states that controlled it. The Khyber Pass is considered one of the most famous mountain passes in the world. 

The inhabitants of the area are predominantly from the Afridi and Shinwari tribes of Pashtuns.

Geography

The Khyber Pass is a mountain pass in the Khyber Pakhtunkhwa province of Pakistan, on the border with Afghanistan (Nangarhar Province).

History

Historical invasions of the Indian subcontinent have been predominantly through the Khyber Pass, such as those of Cyrus, Darius I, Genghis Khan, and later Mongols such as Duwa, Qutlugh Khwaja and Kebek. Prior to the Kushan era, the Khyber Pass was not a widely used trade route. 

The Khyber Pass became a critical part of the Silk Road, a major trade route from East Asia to Europe. 

The Parthian Empire fought for control of passes such as this to profit from the trade in silk, jade, rhubarb, and other luxuries moving from China to Western Asia and Europe. Through the Khyber Pass, Gandhara (in present-day Pakistan) became a regional center of trade connecting Bagram in Afghanistan to Taxila in Pakistan, adding Indian luxury goods such as ivory, pepper, and textiles to the Silk Road commerce.

Among the Muslim invasions of the Indian subcontinent through the Khyber Pass were Mahmud Ghaznavi, Muhammad Ghori and the Turkic-Mongols. Finally, Sikhs under Ranjit Singh captured the Khyber Pass in 1834. The Sikh general Hari Singh Nalwa, who manned the Khyber Pass for years, became a household name in Afghanistan. A common phrase at the time described the length of what was then India as "Khyber to Kanyakumari".

To the north of the Khyber Pass lies the country of the Shalmani tribe and Mullagori tribe. To the south is Afridi Tirah, while the inhabitants of villages in the Pass itself are Afridi clansmen. Throughout the centuries, Pashtun clans, particularly the Afridis and the Afghan Shinwaris, have regarded the Pass as their own preserve and have levied a toll on travellers for safe conduct. Since this has long been their main source of income, resistance to challenges to the Shinwaris' authority has often been fierce.

For strategic reasons, after the First World War, the government of British India built a heavily engineered railway through the Pass. The Khyber Pass Railway, from Jamrud, near Peshawar, to the Afghan border near Landi Kotal was opened in 1925.

During World War II, concrete dragon's teeth were erected on the valley floor due to British fears of a German tank invasion of India. 

The Pass became widely known to thousands of Westerners and Japanese who traveled it in the days of the hippie trail, taking a bus or car from Kabul to the Afghan border.  At the Pakistani frontier post, travelers were advised not to wander away from the road, as the location was a barely controlled Federally Administered Tribal Area.  Then, after customs formalities, a quick daylight drive through the Pass was made.  Monuments left by British Indian Army units, as well as hillside forts, could be viewed from the highway.
The area of the Khyber Pass has been connected with a counterfeit arms industry that makes various types of weapons known to gun collectors as Khyber Pass copies using local steel and blacksmiths' forges.

Current conflicts

During the War in Afghanistan, the Khyber Pass was a major route for resupplying military armament and food to NATO forces in the Afghan theater of conflict since the US started the invasion of Afghanistan in 2001. Almost 80 percent of the NATO and US supplies that were brought in by road were transported through the Khyber Pass. It was also used to transport civilians from the Afghan side to the Pakistani one. Until the end of 2007, the route had been relatively safe, since the tribes living there (mainly the Afridi, a Pashtun tribe) were paid by the Pakistani government to keep the area safe. However, after that year, the Taliban began to control the region, and so wider tensions started to exist in their political relationship.

Since the end of 2008, supply convoys and depots in this western part had increasingly come under attack by elements from or supposedly sympathetic to the Pakistani Taliban.

In January 2009, Pakistan sealed off the bridge as part of a military offensive against Taliban guerrillas. This military operation was mainly focused on Jamrud, a district on the Khyber road. The target was to “dynamite or bulldoze homes belonging to men suspected of harboring or supporting Taliban militants or carrying out other illegal activities”. The result meant that more than 70 people were arrested and 45 homes were destroyed. In addition, two children and one woman were killed. As a response, in early February 2009, Taliban insurgents cut off the Khyber Pass temporarily by blowing up a key bridge.

This increasingly unstable situation in northwest Pakistan, made the US and NATO broaden supply routes, through Central Asia (Turkmenistan, Uzbekistan and Tajikistan). Even the option of supplying material through the Iranian far southeastern port of Chabahar was considered.

In 2010, the already complicated relationship with Pakistan (always accused by the US of hosting the Taliban in this border area without reporting it) became tougher after the NATO forces, under the pretext of mitigating the Taliban's power over this area, executed an attack with drones over the Durand line, passing the frontier of Afghanistan and killing three Pakistani soldiers. Pakistan answered by closing the pass on 30 September which caused a convoy of several NATO trucks to queue at the closed border. This convoy was attacked by extremists apparently linked to Al Qaida which caused the destruction of more than 29 oil tankers and trucks and the killing of several soldiers. NATO chief members had to issue a formal apology to the Pakistani government so the supply traffic at this pass could be restored.

In August 2011, the activity at the Khyber pass was again halted by the Khyber Agency administration due to the more possible attacks of the insurgency over the NATO forces, which had suffered a period of large number of assaults over the trucks heading to supply the NATO and ISAF coalitions all over the frontier line. This instability made the Pakistan Oil Tanker Owners Association demand more protection from the Pakistani and US government threatening not to supply fuel for the Afghan side.

Gallery

Cultural references

A number of locations around the world have been named after the Khyber Pass:
 A steep and twisting minor road in Mugdock Country Park near Glasgow, Scotland. The road is a landmark along the West Highland Way and is popular among local road cyclists.
A suburb of Civil Lines, Delhi, India.
 Khyber Pass Road, a major road in the suburb of Newmarket, Auckland, New Zealand: Google Earth view
 An artificial rockwork feature at East Park, Kingston upon Hull, UK.
 Khyber Road in Phoenix Park, Dublin, Ireland.
 A steep and twisting road up the West Cliff at Whitby, UK.
 A pedestrian alley in Stromness, Orkney, Scotland
 Khyber Pass Pub in Philadelphia, Pennsylvania.
 Khyber Himalayan Resort and Spa in Gulmarg Jammu and Kashmir.
 A mountain bike trail connecting the Top of the World trail at Whistler, British Columbia to the Whistler Creekside Village.
 A subway in the King's Cross St Pancras tube station. After the King's Cross fire in November 1987, it was replaced.

Other references include the following:
 The bus journey on this road was belle-lettered very beautifully, and a part of its first act, in the selective memoir Deshe Bideshe (1948) by Syed Mujtaba Ali.
 Before the partition of India, the pass was mentioned as part of common Hindustani phrase used to describe the length of colonial India, "Khyber sé Kanyakumari".
 'Khyber Pass' is Cockney rhyming slang meaning 'ass'. This use is alluded to in the 1968 film Carry On Up the Khyber.
In the 1975 movie The Man Who Would Be King, the character Peachy Carnehan tells Rudyard Kipling how he and his comrade-in-arms Danny Dravot had fought under Frederick Roberts, 1st Earl Roberts yard by yard through the Khyber Pass during the Second Anglo-Afghan War of 1878-1880
 The podcast Twilight Histories has an episode called "Napoleon in Afghanistan" which partly takes place in the Khyber Pass.
 The Vampire Weekend song "M79" references the Khyber Pass.
 The Tom Cochrane song "Life Is a Highway" (covered by Rascal Flatts and others) references the Khyber Pass.
 The album Rio Grande Blood by Ministry (2006) has a song called "Khyber Pass" which references it as a possible hiding place for then missing and at large Osama bin Laden. This song was also featured at the end of the film The Hurt Locker.
 The song "Red War" by Probot, featuring Max Cavalera on vocals, mentions the pass.
 British rock band Pink Floyd references the Khyber in their song "Up the Khyber", featured on the soundtrack to the film More.
In an episode of the cartoon series The World of Commander McBragg titled “Khyber Pass”, the eponymous commander has to fend off ten thousand screaming tribesmen in the Khyber Pass.
 Parts of the 1985 Jay McInerney book Ransom take place in or near the Khyber Pass.
The Khyber pass features in several of Rudyard Kipling's poems: it appears by name in "The Ballad of the King's Jest", as "the Pass" in "Arithmetic on the Frontier", and semi-fictionalized as the Tongue of Jagai in "The Ballad of East and West".

See also
 Ali Masjid 
 Bab-e-Khyber
 Battle of Ali Masjid
 Battle of Khyber Pass
 Bolan Pass
 Carry On... Up the Khyber, film
 Dasht-e Yahudi
 Dorah Pass
 Durand Line
 Khyber Agency
 Khyber Pass Copy
 Khyber Pass Railway
 Khyber Pass Economic Corridor
 Khyber Rifles
 Khyber train safari

References

Further reading

External links

 History of Khyber Pass, Pakistan
 Twilight histories, Napoleon in Afghanistan

Afghanistan–Pakistan border crossings
Landforms of Paktia Province
Mountain passes of Afghanistan
Mountain passes of Khyber Pakhtunkhwa
Mountain passes of the Hindu Kush
Rail mountain passes
Sites along the Silk Road
Khyber Pakhtunkhwa